Xangri-lá is a Municipality located on the south coast of Brazil, in the state Rio Grande do Sul. It is 134 kilometers from Porto Alegre, the state capital.

See also
List of municipalities in Rio Grande do Sul

References

Populated coastal places in Rio Grande do Sul
Municipalities in Rio Grande do Sul